L0 may refer to:
 Haplogroup L0 (mtDNA), a human mitochondrial DNA haplogroup
 L0 norm, a norm in mathematics
 L0 Series, a high-speed maglev train operated by the Japanese railway company JR Central

See also
 Level 0 (disambiguation)